László Mészáros (born 12 May 1977) is a former Hungarian football player.

References 
Data Retrieved 10 October 2010

1977 births
Living people
Hungarian footballers
Fortuna Sittard players
VVV-Venlo players
Debreceni VSC players
Hungarian expatriate footballers
Expatriate footballers in the Netherlands
Association football midfielders